Noeun Station is a station of Daejeon Metro Line 1 in Noeun-dong, Yuseong District, Daejeon, South Korea.

Surroundings 
In the vicinity of Nogun Station, there are Ji Jok Mountain, DaeJeon Ji jok High School, DaeJeon Ji juk Middle School, DaeJon SangJi Elementary School, Durubong Neighborhood Park and Eung- GuBi Park.

The location is 161 underground of Noeun in Yuseong-gu, Daejeon Metropolitan City.

References

External links
  Noeun Station from Daejeon Metropolitan Express Transit Corporation

Daejeon Metro stations
Yuseong District
Railway stations opened in 2007